When Silence Falls is the second Christian music album by Tim Hughes.

Track listing
 "Beautiful One"
 "You"
 "Consuming Fire" 
 "Giver of Life" 
 "Whole World in His Hands" 
 "Beauty of Your Peace" 
 "Name Above All Names" 
 "When the Tears Fall" 
 "Nothing in This World" 
 "Joy Is in This Place"
 "Holy - Holy" 
 "Beautiful One" (reprise)

Tim Hughes albums
2004 albums
Survivor Records albums